John Maher may refer to:

John A. Maher, American politician
John C. Maher (born 1951), Irish-British linguist
John Maher (Buzzcocks drummer) (born 1960), British car specialist and former drummer of The Buzzcocks
John Maher (Delancey Street) (1940–1988), founder of the Delancey Street Foundation
John Maher (Kilkenny hurler) (born 1977), Irish hurler
John Maher (Tipperary hurler) (1908–1980), Irish hurler
John W. Maher (1866–1917), American politician and veterinarian
Johnny Marr (born 1963), English guitarist, born John Martin Maher

See also
John Marre, American soccer player
John Mair (disambiguation)
John Mayer (disambiguation)
John Mayor (disambiguation)
John Meier (disambiguation)
John Meyer (disambiguation)